Tantillus is a genus of ground beetles in the family Carabidae. There are about 12 described species in Tantillus, found in South and Southeast Asia.

Species
These 12 species belong to the genus Tantillus:

 Tantillus brunneus Chaudoir, 1870  (Sri Lanka)
 Tantillus imbricatus Fedorenko, 2018  (Borneo, Indonesia, and Malaysia)
 Tantillus klapperichi (Jedlicka, 1953)  (China)
 Tantillus longipenis Fedorenko, 2018  (Vietnam)
 Tantillus niger (Jedlicka, 1934)  (Papua and Philippines)
 Tantillus philippinensis (Jedlicka, 1934)  (Philippines)
 Tantillus quadripunctatus Fedorenko, 2018  (Sri Lanka)
 Tantillus reflexicollis Fedorenko, 2018  (India)
 Tantillus semiopacus Fedorenko, 2018  (Vietnam)
 Tantillus sericans (Schmidt-Goebel, 1846)  (Indonesia, Myanmar, and Singapore)
 Tantillus subnitens Fedorenko, 2018  (Vietnam)
 Tantillus vittatus Bates, 1886  (Sri Lanka)

References

Lebiinae